Phil Moore may refer to:

Phil Moore (actor), host of the game show Nick Arcade
Phil Moore (jazz musician), pianist, orchestral arranger, and band leader
Phil Moore, Author of the straight to the heart series.

See also
Philip Moore (disambiguation)